Marine Protected Areas (MPAs) are zones within Canadian waters where the marine environment enjoys a high level of environmental protection. Marine Protected Areas are governed by the Oceans Act of 1996 and administered by Fisheries and Oceans Canada.

Scope of protection
Designation as a Marine Protected Area does not automatically prohibit fishing and other activities. Activities within these areas are assessed on a case-by-case basis and will be allowed if they are consistent with the conservation objectives of the specific area.

On 25 April 2019, new standards were adopted for marine protected areas that prohibit four industrial activities: oil and gas activities, mining, dumping, and bottom trawling. These standards do not retroactively void existing oil and gas licenses, or void previously approved bottom trawling activities. Instead, the department will assess each issue of these now prohibited activities on a case-by-case basis to ensure they're in line with the conservation objectives of the specific area.

Adding to the system
Fisheries and Oceans Canada collaborates with interested and affected parties to provide input into the establishment of a marine protected area. When an area is under consideration to become a marine protected area, it is identified as an Area of Interest. If further study is required to develop an appropriate long-term conservation approach, it is identified as a Study Area.

The department determines the viability of a proposal based upon the ecological, biophysical, social, cultural, and economic aspects of the area. Based on the overview and assessment reports, the conservation objectives of the proposed MPA are elaborated upon and the regulatory measures are developed. The proposal is then published in Canada Gazette, Part I for public comment, at which point regulations may be modified to reflect comments received. Once finalized, official MPA designation occurs when its regulations are published in Canada Gazette, Part II.

List of Marine Protected Areas

Areas of Interest

See also
National Marine Conservation Area

References